Citizen Cain'd is the twentieth solo album by Julian Cope, released in January 2005. The album was released as two CDs of 34 and 37 minutes respectively because Cope deemed several of the songs "too psychologically exhausting" for one single listen.

Blending Stooges-style garage rock and stoner rock grooves, country rock and balladry, Citizen Cain'd has been described as "an excellent return to song-based songwriting" and "best Cope album in a decade".

Track listing

Personnel
Musicians
Julian Cope
Anthony "Doggen" Foster
David "Mitch Razor" Francolini
Christopher Patrick "Holy" McGrail
Mrs Helen Ramsay
Donald Ross Skinner
Technical
Recorded by David Francolini, Terry Dobbin
Design by Holy McGrail
Mastered by Adam "Randy Apostle" Whittaker

References

External links
Citizen Cain'd on Discogs.com

2005 albums
Julian Cope albums